Zenzi is a character appearing in American comic books published by Marvel Comics. Created by Ta-Nehisi Coates and Brian Stelfreeze, the character first appeared in Black Panther  #1 (April 2016). She is an adversary of the superhero Black Panther.

Publication history
Zenzi was created by Ta-Nehisi Coates and Brian Stelfreeze. She first appeared in Black Panther  #1 (April 2016).

Fictional character biography
Zenzi came from the African country of Niganda. Zenzi ran away from her homeland after Killmonger made some experiments on her and several inhabitants against their will.

She led the army of her home country and started an alliance with Tetu. The Black Panther tried to stop Zenzi at some point. She used her powers against him the first time to escape him. But she ended up in coma after the Black Panther during an ambush later. Nonetheless, Tetu helped Zenzi escape.

She later allied herself with Baron Zemo and Hydra.

Powers and abilities
Zenzi has the ability to sense and manipulate people's emotions. She can use her powers to make her targets exceed their limits.

Reception
 In 2020, CBR.com ranked Zenzi 7th in their "Marvel: Ranking Black Panther's Rogues Gallery" list.
 In 2022, Screen Rant included Zenzi in their "15 Best Black Panther Comics Characters Not In The MCU" list. 
 In 2022, CBR.com ranked Zenzi 8th in their "10 Most Iconic Black Panther Villains" list.

References

Comics characters introduced in 2016
Marvel Comics characters